The 2015–16 UTEP Miners women's basketball team represents the University of Texas at El Paso during the 2015–16 NCAA Division I women's basketball season. The Lady Miners, led by fifteenth year head coach Keitha Adams, play their home games at Don Haskins Center and were members of Conference USA. They finished the season 29–5, 16–2 in C-USA play to win the C-USA regular season title. They advanced to the semifinals of the C-USA women's tournament where they lost to Old Dominion. They received an automatic to the Women's National Invitation Tournament where they defeated Abilene Christian, Arkansas State and TCU in the first, second and third rounds before falling to Oregon in the quarterfinals.

Roster

Schedule

|-
!colspan="9" style="background:#FF7F00; color:#000080;"| Exhibition

|-
!colspan="9" style="background:#FF7F00; color:#000080;"| Non-conference regular season

|-
!colspan="9" style="background:#FF7F00; color:#000080;"| Conference USA regular season

|-
!colspan="9" style="background:#FF7F00; color:#000080;"| C-USA Women's Tournament

|-
!colspan="9" style="background:#FF7F00; color:#000080;"| WNIT

Rankings

See also
2015–16 UTEP Miners basketball team

References

UTEP Miners women's basketball seasons
UTEP
2016 Women's National Invitation Tournament participants